New Adventures in Hi-Fi is the tenth studio album by the American alternative rock band R.E.M. It was their fifth major-label release for Warner Bros. Records, released on September 9, 1996, in Europe and Australia, and the following day in the United States. New Adventures in Hi-Fi was the last album recorded with founding member Bill Berry (who left the band amicably the following year), original manager Jefferson Holt, and long-time producer Scott Litt. The members of R.E.M. consider the recorded album representative of the band at their peak, and fans generally regard it as the band's last great record before a perceived artistic decline during the late 1990s and early 2000s. It has sold around seven million units, growing in cult status years after its release, with several retrospectives ranking it among the top of the band's recorded catalogue.

Composition and recording
The album was recorded during and after the tour in support of Monster in 1995. The material on the album mixed the acoustic, country rock feel of much of Out of Time and Automatic for the People with the rock sound of Monster and Lifes Rich Pageant. The band has cited Neil Young's 1973 album Time Fades Away as a source of inspiration.

In an interview with Mojo, the band's bass guitarist Mike Mills said:

The band noted that they borrowed the recording process for the album from Radiohead, who recorded some of the basic tracks for The Bends while on tour and who supported the band in 1994 and 1995. R.E.M. took eight-track recorders to capture their live performances, and used the recordings as the base elements for the album. As such, the band's touring musicians Nathan December and Scott McCaughey are featured throughout, with Andy Carlson contributing violin to "Electrolite".

After the tour was over, the band went into Seattle's Bad Animals Studio and recorded four additional tracks: "How the West Was Won and Where It Got Us", "E-Bow the Letter", "Be Mine" and "New Test Leper". Patti Smith came to the sessions and contributed vocals on "E-Bow the Letter". Audio mixing was finished at John Keane Studio in Athens and Louie's Clubhouse in Los Angeles with mastering by Bob Ludwig at Gateway Mastering in Portland, Maine.

In part due to the nature of the recording process, several of the songs are about travel and motion—including "Departure", "Leave" and "Low Desert". The album's liner notes contain pictures from the road and the deluxe edition of the album is a hardcover book in a slipcase featuring more photographs of R.E.M.'s tour.

Critical reception

Critical reaction to the album was mostly favorable. Several publications lauded the album for its rich diversity, including Rolling Stone, Q, and Mojo. Stephen Thomas Erlewine of AllMusic said, "In its multifaceted sprawl, [R.E.M.] wound up with one of their best records of the '90s." At the same time, however, Melody Maker criticized the album's empty and flat sound caused by recording in arenas and soundchecks. In a 2017 retrospective on the band, Consequence of Sound ranked it third out of R.E.M.'s 15 full-length studio albums.

The album is lead vocalist Michael Stipe's favorite from R.E.M. and he considers it the band at their peak. Radiohead singer Thom Yorke, who cited R.E.M. as a major influence, said it was his favorite R.E.M. album and "Electrolite" was the greatest song of their career.

Awards
New Adventures in Hi-Fi has since appeared on several lists compiling the best albums of the 1990s or all time: Magnet listed the album at #20 on its list of the "Top 60 Albums 1993–2003", and Mojo also listed the album at #20 on a list of "The 100 Greatest Albums of Our Lifetime 1993–2006".

It was voted #186 in Colin Larkin's All Time Top 1000 Albums (3rd Edition, 2000). It was also featured on several year-end best-of lists for 1996:
Entertainment Weekly (#2)
Eye Weekly (#11)
The Face (#28)
Magnet (#26)
Mojo (#4)
NME (#16)
Q (unranked)
Rock Sound (French edition) (#2)
Rolling Stone (#4)
Spin (#11)
Village Voice (#11)

Track listing
All songs written by Bill Berry, Peter Buck, Mike Mills and Michael Stipe.

The Hi Side
"How the West Was Won and Where It Got Us" – 4:31
"The Wake-Up Bomb" – 5:08
"New Test Leper" – 5:26
"Undertow" – 5:09
"E-Bow the Letter" – 5:23
"Leave" – 7:18

The Fi Side
"Departure" – 3:28
"Bittersweet Me" – 4:06
"Be Mine" – 5:32
"Binky the Doormat" – 5:01
"Zither" – 2:33
"So Fast, So Numb" – 4:12
"Low Desert" – 3:30
"Electrolite" – 4:05

Unlike most R.E.M. albums, this vinyl release did not have custom side names and was instead released as a double album. Record one has tracks 1–6 (three songs per side) and record two has tracks 7–14 (four songs per side). The tape release maintained the custom side names: the first side was called the "Hi-side" and the second side was called the "Fi-side."

Singles and B-sides
New Adventures in Hi-Fi consisted of material written during some of the same sessions as Monster and its following promotional tour; consequently, there were few outtakes or left-over tracks for inclusion as B-sides. The first three tracks were international singles, with "How the West Was Won and Where It Got Us" being released only in Germany and Japan.

"E-Bow the Letter"
"Tricycle" – recorded during soundcheck at the Riverport Amphitheater, St. Louis, Missouri, on September 22, 1995.
"Departure" (Rome soundcheck version) – recorded during soundcheck at the PalaEur, Rome, Italy, on February 22, 1995.
"Wall of Death" (Richard Thompson) – taken from the Richard Thompson tribute album Beat the Retreat.

"Bittersweet Me"
"Undertow" (Live) – recorded at the Omni Theater, Atlanta, Georgia, on November 18, 1995. Taken from the live performance video Road Movie.
"Wichita Lineman" (Jimmy Webb) – recorded at The Woodlands, Texas, on September 15, 1995.
"New Test Leper" (Live acoustic) – recorded at Bad Animals Studio, Seattle, Washington, on April 19, 1996.

"Electrolite"
"The Wake-Up Bomb" (Live) – recorded at the Omni Theater, Atlanta, Georgia, on November 18, 1995. Taken from Road Movie.
"Binky the Doormat" (Live) – recorded at the Omni Theater, Atlanta, Georgia, on November 18, 1995. Taken from Road Movie.
"King of Comedy" (808 State remix)

"How the West Was Won and Where It Got Us"
"Be Mine" (Mike on the Bus Version)
"Love Is All Around" (Reg Presley) – previously released on the 1996 soundtrack for I Shot Andy Warhol.
"Sponge" (Vic Chesnutt) – previously released on the Chesnutt benefit album Sweet Relief II in 1996.

"Revolution" was also released from these sessions—initially on the Batman & Robin soundtrack and later on disc two of In Time: The Best of R.E.M. 1988–2003.

Other singles

"New Test Leper" and "The Wake-Up Bomb" were released as promotional singles for the album; the former had a music video directed by Lance Bangs and Dominic DeJoseph. All five videos from the album were later collected on In View: The Best of R.E.M. 1988–2003.

The R.E.M. fan club, which issued a special single every year at Christmas time, featured two singles recorded during these sessions: 1996's "Only in America" (originally by Jay & The Americans)/"I Will Survive" (a Gloria Gaynor cover) and 1997's R.E.M. original "Live for Today" was backed with Pearl Jam's "Happy When I'm Crying".

Personnel
"How the West Was Won and Where It Got Us"
Recorded at Bad Animals Studio in Seattle, Washington
Bill Berry – drums, percussion, "ennio whistle"
Peter Buck – guitar, mandolin, bouzouki, bass guitar
Mike Mills – piano, backing vocals, synthesizer
Michael Stipe – vocals, synthesizer

"The Wake-Up Bomb"
Recorded live at the North Charleston Coliseum in Charleston, South Carolina, on November 16, 1995
Bill Berry – drums, percussion
Peter Buck – guitar
Nathan December – guitar
Mike Mills – bass guitar, backing vocals, organ
Michael Stipe – vocals

"New Test Leper"
Recorded at Bad Animals Studio in Seattle, Washington
Bill Berry – drums, percussion
Peter Buck – guitar
Mike Mills – bass guitar, organ
Michael Stipe – vocals

"Undertow"
Recorded live at the FleetCenter in Boston, Massachusetts, on October 3, 1995
Bill Berry – drums, percussion
Peter Buck – guitar
Nathan December – guitar
Mike Mills – bass guitar, backing vocals
Michael Stipe – vocals

"E-Bow the Letter"
Recorded at Bad Animals Studio in Seattle, Washington
Bill Berry – drums, percussion
Peter Buck – guitar, E-bow, electric sitar
Mike Mills – bass guitar, organ, Moog synthesizer, Mellotron
Patti Smith – vocals
Michael Stipe – vocals

"Leave"
Recorded at a soundcheck at the Omni Theater in Atlanta, Georgia, on November 18, 19, or 21, 1995
Bill Berry – drums, percussion, acoustic guitar, synthesizer
Peter Buck – guitar, E-bow
Nathan December – guitar
Scott McCaughey – ARP Odyssey
Mike Mills – bass guitar, keyboards
Michael Stipe – vocals

"Departure"
Recorded live at The Palace of Auburn Hills in Auburn Hills, Michigan, on June 6 or 7, 1995
Bill Berry – drums, percussion
Peter Buck – guitar
Nathan December – guitar
Mike Mills – fuzz bass, backing vocals, Farfisa organ
Michael Stipe – vocals

"Bittersweet Me"
Recorded at a soundcheck at the Pyramid Arena in Memphis, Tennessee, on November 7, 1995
Bill Berry – drums, percussion
Peter Buck – guitar
Scott McCaughey – piano
Mike Mills – bass guitar, organ, Mellotron
Michael Stipe – vocals

"Be Mine"
Recorded at Bad Animals Studio in Seattle, Washington
Bill Berry – drums, percussion
Peter Buck – bass guitar, guitar, E-bow
Mike Mills – guitar, backing vocals, keyboards
Michael Stipe – vocals

"Binky the Doormat"
Recorded live at the Desert Sky Pavilion in Phoenix, Arizona, on November 4, 1995
Bill Berry – drums, percussion, backing vocals
Peter Buck – guitar
Nathan December – guitar
Scott McCaughey – Farfisa organ
Mike Mills – fuzz bass, backing vocals, keyboards
Michael Stipe – vocals

"Zither"
Recorded in the dressing room of The Spectrum in Philadelphia, Pennsylvania, on October 12, 13, or 14, 1995
Bill Berry – bass guitar
Peter Buck – guitar
Nathan December – tambourine
Scott McCaughey – autoharp
Mike Mills – organ
Michael Stipe – count in

"So Fast, So Numb"
Recorded at a soundcheck at the Orlando Arena in Orlando, Florida, on November 15, 1995
Bill Berry – drums, percussion
Peter Buck – guitar
Scott McCaughey – piano
Mike Mills – bass guitar, backing vocals, organ
Michael Stipe – vocals

"Low Desert"
Recorded at a soundcheck at the Omni Theater in Atlanta, Georgia, on November 18, 19, or 21, 1995
Bill Berry – drums, percussion
Peter Buck – guitar
Nathan December – slide guitar
Scott McCaughey – piano
Mike Mills – bass guitar, organ
Michael Stipe – vocals

"Electrolite"
Recorded at a soundcheck at the Desert Sky Pavilion in Phoenix, Arizona, on November 4, 1995
Bill Berry – drums, percussion
Peter Buck – bass guitar, banjo
Andy Carlson – violin
Nathan December – guiro
Mike Mills – piano
Michael Stipe – vocals

Technical crew
William Field – assistant engineering, Athens
Sam Hofstedt – assistant engineering, Seattle
Victor Janacua – assistant engineering, Los Angeles
Adam Kasper – recording engineering, Seattle
John Keane – recording and mixing
Scott Litt – co-producing and mixing engineering
Bob Ludwig/Gateway Mastering – mastering
Pat McCarthy – recording engineering, Los Angeles
Mark "Microwave" Mytrowitz – technical assistance
Joe O'Herlihy – tour recording engineering
Jo Ravitch – tour recording engineering
Eric Stolz – digital editing
Jeff Wooding – tour recording engineering

Sale chart performance
While New Adventures in Hi-Fi began the band's sales decline in the United States, it topped the charts in over a dozen countries and reached #1 on the Top European Albums for five consecutive weeks. The album peaked at #2 on the U.S. Billboard 200 and spent 22 weeks on chart. According to Nielsen SoundScan, it has sold 994,000 units in the U.S. as of March 2007. The first single, "E-Bow the Letter", received only modest radio airplay in the U.S. and peaked at #49 on its charts. In the UK, however, the single became the band's biggest hit at that point, reaching #4.

Weekly charts

Year-end charts

Certifications

Release history
Like all R.E.M. albums since 1988's Green, New Adventures in Hi-Fi was released in a limited-edition packaging. This one contained a 64-page hardcover book designed by Chris Bilheimer and featuring photos from the Monster tour. In 2005, Warner Brothers Records issued an expanded two-disc edition of the album which included a CD, a DVD-Audio disc containing a new audio mix of the album (in 5.1-channel surround sound, high resolution, AC3, Dolby Stereo, and DTS 5.1) done by Elliot Scheiner and the original CD booklet with expanded liner notes. In addition, the DVD includes a video documentary, lyrics, and a photo gallery.

As with the prior albums, a 25th-anniversary edition was announced in August 2021 for an October release date. The edition includes a remastered album, B-sides from the album and a Blu-ray with previously unreleased promotional materials. Due to issues related to the 2021 global supply chain crisis, all CD variations of the remastered reissue are delayed to mid-November 2021.

References

External links

New Adventures in Hi-Fi from REMHQ.com
New Adventures in Hi-Fi press release

The story of New Adventures in Hi-Fi

1996 albums
1996 live albums
Albums produced by Bill Berry
Albums produced by Michael Stipe
Albums produced by Mike Mills
Albums produced by Peter Buck
Albums produced by Scott Litt
R.E.M. albums
R.E.M. live albums
Warner Records albums
Warner Records live albums
Live hard rock albums